Katherine Baldwin (born May 2, 1975) is an American singer and actress known for her work in musical theater. She received a Tony Award nomination for her work in the 2009 Broadway revival of Finian's Rainbow. She also co-starred opposite Bette Midler, David Hyde Pierce, and Gavin Creel in the Broadway revival of Hello, Dolly!, for which she received Tony, Drama Desk, and Outer Critics Circle award nominations for her work as the saucy millineress Irene Molloy. Baldwin continued with the production until it closed in August 2018.

Biography
Born in Evanston, Illinois, Baldwin graduated from Shorewood High School in Shorewood, Wisconsin in 1993, and from the theatre program at Northwestern University in 1997. As a youth she attended Interlochen Arts Camp.

During her four years at Northwestern, she performed in seventeen university stage productions and studied voice with Marie Michuda, who helped to make Baldwin a versatile performer. In March of her senior year, Baldwin auditioned for the musical Baby which was being produced at the Marriott Lincolnshire Theatre, in Lincolnshire, Illinois, and obtained her Equity card for her work in the production. She stayed in the Chicago area, performing in multiple other Marriott Lincolnshire productions, before moving to New York City.

Career
Baldwin made her Broadway debut as a swing in the original Broadway production of The Full Monty (2000). Additional Broadway credits include:
 Thoroughly Modern Millie (2002) - Daphne/Lucille, Miss Dorothy Understudy
 Wonderful Town revival (2004) - Helen [Replacement]
 Finian's Rainbow revival (2009) - Sharon McLonergan (Tony, Drama Desk, Outer Critic's Circle noms)
 Big Fish (2013) - Sandra Bloom
 Hello, Dolly! revival (2017) - Irene Molloy (Tony, Drama Desk, Outer Critic's Circle noms)

Baldwin's off-Broadway credits include:
 Babes in Arms** 
 A Connecticut Yankee**
 Bloomer Girl**
 Bush is Bad**
 Finian's Rainbow**
 Giant (Drama Desk nom)
 John & Jen (Drama Desk nom)
 Songbird
Superhero (Lucille Lortel nom)

** notes Encores! New York City Center performance

Along with all of her Broadway and Off-Broadway credits she has also accumulated an extensive amount of regional theater credits. One of the most notable being her portrayal of Nellie Forbush in the 2002 Arena Stage production of South Pacific, for which she was nominated for a Helen Hayes Award. Additional credits include She Loves Me, Guys and Dolls, Can-Can, The King and I, and many others.

Baldwin played the role of Sharon in the 2009 New York City Center Encores! staged concert production of Finian's Rainbow. The New York Times critic Charles Isherwood called her a "discovery" and praised her performance, noting she sang the role "beautifully...  her rich, pure soprano riding the crests of the melodies with ease." She reprised the role in the Broadway revival that brought the Encores! production to the St. James Theatre in October 2009. Her performance received positive notices again, as well as a Tony Award nomination for Best Actress in Musical.

In October 2009, Baldwin released her first solo album, Let's See What Happens, a compilation of songs written by Burton Lane and E. Y. Harburg. More recently, she released an album dedicated solely to the work of the team, Jerry Bock and Sheldon Harnick, titled She Loves Him.

In the West End, the premiere of the new musical Paradise Found featured Baldwin in a production co-directed by Harold Prince and Susan Stroman at the Menier Chocolate Factory in London (May 19 – June 26, 2010). The Telegraph reviewer wrote of her performance: "The best performance comes from Kate Baldwin, who is both affecting and a succulent feast for the eye, as Mizzi."

Baldwin appeared in the Broadway revival of Hello, Dolly! as Irene Molloy, opposite Bette Midler. The musical opened at the Shubert Theatre on April 20, 2017 and closed on August 25, 2018.

In 2020, Baldwin was scheduled to appear in New York City Center's production of Love Life directed by Victoria Clark, and starring opposite Brian Stoke Mitchell. However, the production was postponed and later cancelled due to the COVID-19 pandemic.

Personal life
Baldwin met her husband, actor Graham Rowat, in 2003 during a Washington DC production of 1776, in which he played Richard Henry Lee and she played Martha Jefferson. Because they both had a lot of downtime during act two of the musical, they bonded quickly and began dating after the show closing. They married on October 2, 2005, and on April 19, 2011 welcomed their son, Colin James. The husband and wife acting duo have done multiple regional shows together since 1776, including Bells Are Ringing and A Little Night Music.

Awards and nominations

Additional credits
Opening Doors concert, Zankel Hall, October 2004
Miss Saigon, Paper Mill Playhouse, 2002
Hello, Dolly!, Paper Mill Playhouse, June 2006
Seven Brides for Seven Brothers, The Muny, St. Louis, August 2006
The Pajama Game, The Muny, St. Louis, July 2007
White Christmas, San Francisco, November 2005-December 2005 and Toronto, November 2007-January 2008
She Loves Me, Huntington Theatre Company and Williamstown Theatre Festival, Massachusetts, May 2008-June 2008
My Fair Lady, Sacramento Music Circus, August 2008
The Broadway Musicals of 1927, "Broadway By the Year" February 22, 2010, The Town Hall, New York

References

External links

Kate Baldwin at Broadwayworld.com
Kate Baldwin at ToDoMusicales.com 

1975 births
Living people
Actresses from Evanston, Illinois
Northwestern University School of Communication alumni
People from Shorewood, Wisconsin
American musical theatre actresses
Actresses from Wisconsin
20th-century American actresses
21st-century American actresses
Musicians from Evanston, Illinois
Singers from Wisconsin
Singers from Illinois
20th-century American singers
21st-century American women singers
20th-century American women singers
Shorewood High School (Wisconsin) alumni